Skydiving was an independent, monthly news magazine covering the events, equipment, techniques, people and places of sport parachuting. It was based in DeLand, Florida, and was launched in 1979. The magazine founder was Mike Truffer. Skydiving ceased publication in 2009.

References

External links
Official website 

1979 establishments in Florida
2009 disestablishments in Florida
Monthly magazines published in the United States
Sports magazines published in the United States
Defunct magazines published in the United States
Magazines established in 1979
Magazines disestablished in 2009
Magazines published in Florida
Parachuting